CSSR may refer to:
 Czechoslovak Socialist Republic (Czech and Slovak: ČSSR), onetime name of Czechoslovakia
 Climate Science Special Report, Volume 1 of the Fourth National Climate Assessment (NCA4) 2017/2018
 Canadian Society for the Study of Religion
 Canadian Society for the Study of Rhetoric
 Center for the Study of Science and Religion, a center inside The Earth Institute at Columbia University
 Congregatio Sanctissimi Redemptoris, Latin name of the Congregation of the Most Holy Redeemer, abbreviated to C.Ss.R
 Council with Social Services Responsibilities, part of the UK Healthcare Commission
 Centre for Social Studies and Reforms (CSSR), based in Cochin, Kerala, India
 Call setup success rate, a term used in telecommunications denoting the percentage of the attempts to make a call which result in a connection to the dialed number
 Conservative Site-specific recombination